Moinul Islam can refer to:

 Moinul Islam (cricketer, born 1992), a Bangladeshi cricketer
 Moinul Islam (cricketer, born 1996), a Bangladeshi cricketer